Global Defence Force is a PlayStation 2 third-person shooter video game developed by Sandlot. The game was originally published as The Chikyū Bōeigun 2 in Japan by D3 Publisher, as volume 81 of the Simple 2000 series of budget games. It was later released in Europe by Essential Games, the brand created by D3 Publisher to publish Simple 2000 series games in Europe.

Players assume the role of a member of the earth defense force and fight giant insects and other enemies, who have invaded earth from outer space.

A PlayStation Portable version of the game, titled Earth Defense Forces 2 Portable was released on April 7, 2011 in Japan. A PlayStation Vita version, titled as Earth Defense Force 2: Invaders from Planet Space (known in Japan as Earth Defense Forces 2 Portable V2), was released for the first time in North America by Xseed Games in December 2015. A port of Earth Defense Force 2 was released for the Nintendo Switch in Japan in July 2021.

Gameplay

The game is a third-person shooter featuring large play areas and waves of mecha and giant insects. Players control either a foot soldier (Storm-1) who uses conventional weaponry such as assault and sniper rifles, shotguns, and rocket-propelled grenades or a jetpack-equipped soldier (Pale Wing) who uses energy-based weaponry. Most of the game's missions are cleared by eliminating all enemies present, starting with giant ants on earlier stages and eventually progressing to giant lizard enemies. A number of vehicles such as a tank, helicopter and a hover-bike are available in some missions for players to board and attack enemies with. However, only the Storm-1 unit can use the vehicles.

A total of 300 different weapons are available between the two characters, but players are limited to carrying two weapons during missions. Weapons are unlocked by picking up containers dropped by enemies. Every weapon picked up during play will add a random weapon of the character's to the selection, duplicate weapons are discarded. Armor chips and medical kits, also dropped by enemies, increase the character's maximum possible health and recover lost health respectively.

There are a total of 71 missions spread over 7 environments to play through, the first mission taking place in London. Five difficulty levels are available for each mission. Half-medals are awarded for completing a mission on a set difficulty with either character. Completing the same stage with the other character results in a complete medal. Once a player has collected all the medals for every mission, "Impossible" mode is unlocked.

Reception

Global Defence Force received little press attention in the West. The few reviews the game received were generally positive; Games Asylums Matt Gander described it as "one of the PlayStation 2’s best budget buys".  In Japan, Famitsu gave it a score of one eight and three sevens for the PS2 version; and one eight, one seven, and two sixes for the PSP version.

The PlayStation Vita re-release of the game, published by Xseed Games and retitled Earth Defense Force 2: Invaders From Planet Space, received "average" reviews according to the review aggregation website Metacritic. Destructoids Jed Whitaker wrote that the game "has enough original content to keep it feeling fresh alongside the other recent releases in the series", and that it was "easy to recommend to Vita owners looking for some campy over-the-top action in spite of its flaws."  In Japan, Famitsu gave the Vita version a score of three sevens and one nine for a total of 30 out of 40.

During D3 Publisher's simple series awards 2007, the title received a platinum prize for selling more than 200,000 copies in Japan during the 2006 fiscal year. It was the only title in the range to reach this volume of sales.

See also
 Simple series video games

Notes

References

External links
  
 
 

2005 video games
Alien invasions in video games
Cooperative video games
D3 Publisher games
Earth Defense Force
Multiplayer and single-player video games
Nintendo Switch games
PlayStation 2 games
PlayStation Portable games
PlayStation Vita games
Sandlot games
Third-person shooters
Video game sequels
Video games about insects
Video games developed in Japan
Video games scored by Masafumi Takada
Xseed Games games
PQube games